FO Vrilissia, full name Filathlitikos Omilos Vrilissia is Greek volleyball club based in Vrilissia, Athens. It is mainly active in women volleyball and it is one of the most successful clubs in this sport. FO Vrilissia has won 9 Panhellenic titles in women volleyball (5 championships and 4 cups). Despite its successful presence the club retreated from the championship in season 2014-15 due to financial problems and relegated to second tier championship (A2 Ethniki).

History
FO Vrilissia was founded in 1985. At season 1994-95, it won the first championship. Thereafter the club won another four championship (the last in 2003), and four cups (the last in 2004). The next years the club faced financial problems. At season 2005-06 withdrew from the championship and relegated to second tier championship (A2 Ethniki). It returned in 2011 but four years later withdrew again from the championship and relegated in A2 Ethniki.

Recent seasons

Titles
Greek Women's Volleyball Championship
Winner (5): 1995, 1996, 1997, 1999, 2004
Greek Women's Volleyball Cup
Winner (4): 1999, 2000, 2003, 2004

References

External links
 Official Page

Greek volleyball clubs
Volleyball clubs established in 1985
1985 establishments in Greece